Bull pine is a common name for several species of North American “yellow pine” trees — Genus Pinus, Section Trifoliae (“American hard pines”) — especially large, or unusually large and isolated, specimens of the following.

Shortleaf pine (Pinus echinata)
Slash pine (Pinus elliottii)
Jeffrey pine (Pinus jeffreyi)
Ponderosa pine (Pinus ponderosa)
Gray pine (Pinus sabiniana)
Loblolly pine (Pinus taeda)